The 2005–06 Pakistan Premier League season was the 2nd season of Pakistan Premier League and 51st season of Pakistan domestic football.

WAPDA were the defending champions, winning their 1st Pakistan Premier League and 5th Pakistani title last season. 

Pakistan Army won the title on 19 October 2005, after defeating Pakistan Telecommunication 2-0, with 54th and 70th minute goals from Mubassar and Jaffar Hussain, Army had one game to play against WAPDA who were three points away first position. Army won the league regardless of their result against WAPDA due to superior league. Army won the tie against WAPDA 3-1, with a brace from league's and team's top scorer Imran Hussain, Army ended up winning the league by six points. 

Panther and Pakistan Public Work Department were relegated at the end of the season and will be replaced by Karachi Electric Supply Corporation and Pakistan Railways in the coming season.

Teams
Allied Bank, Baloch Nushki, Mardan, Mauripur Baloch, Naka Mohammaden and Young XI DIK were relegated at the end of 2004-05 season and were replaced by National Bank and Pakistan Public Work Department.

League table

Champions

Statistics

Scoring
First goal of the season: Muhammad Essa for Afghan Chaman against Pakistan Public Work Department (31 July 2005).
Last goal of the season: Khuda Bakhsh for WAPDA against Pakistan Army (23 October 2005).
Fastest goal of the season: 52 seconds – Farooq Shah for National Bank against Pakistan Navy (14 January 2013).
Largest winning margin: 10 goals
Pakistan Army 10–0 Wohaib .
Highest scoring game: 10 goals.
Karachi Port Trust 6–4 Panther .
Pakistan Army 10–0 Wohaib .
Most goals scored in a match by a losing team: 4 goals
Karachi Port Trust 6–4 Panther .

Top scorers

Hat-tricks

References

Pakistan Premier League seasons
1
Pakistan